Pa Ousman Sonko (born 26 December 1984 in Banjul) is a retired Gambian footballer.

References

External links

1984 births
Living people
Gambian footballers
The Gambia international footballers
SC Rheindorf Altach players
Austrian Football Bundesliga players
Kapfenberger SV players
SV Austria Salzburg players
SV Seekirchen players
Association football defenders
Gambian emigrants to Austria
FC Red Bull Salzburg players